Vonetta Lawrence McGee (January 14, 1945 – July 9, 2010) was an American actress. She debuted in the Spaghetti Western The Great Silence and went on to appear in blaxploitation films such as Hammer, Melinda, Blacula, Shaft in Africa, Detroit 9000, and 1974's Thomasine & Bushrod alongside her then-boyfriend Max Julien. In 1975, she was Clint Eastwood's co-star in The Eiger Sanction. She was a regular on the 1987 Universal Television situation comedy Bustin' Loose, starring as Mimi Shaw for its only season (1987–88).

Early life
Born in San Francisco, California, to Lawrence McGee and Alma McGee (née Scott), McGee graduated from San Francisco Polytechnic High School in 1962. She enrolled at San Francisco State University and became involved in acting groups on campus.

Career
McGee landed her first role in 1968, when she performed alongside Jean-Louis Trintignant and Klaus Kinski in Sergio Corbucci's Spaghetti Western The Great Silence, and made her first released film appearance that same year as the eponymous character in the Italian comedy Faustina, which was released before the former film. She later became well known for her parts in the 1972 Blaxploitation films Melinda and Hammer. In the action thriller Shaft in Africa (1973), McGee took the role of Aleme, the daughter of an emir, who teaches John Shaft (Richard Roundtree) Ethiopian geography. Earlier that year she had appeared in a supporting role as an occult priestess in The Norliss Tapes. In 1974, McGee appeared as Thomasine, alongside Max Julien as Bushrod, in the western action film Thomasine & Bushrod, which was intended as a counterpart to the 1967 film Bonnie and Clyde. The next year, she starred alongside Clint Eastwood in the action thriller The Eiger Sanction (1975). She appeared in an episode of the TV series Starsky & Hutch named "Black and Blue" in 1979. She appeared as Marlene, the high-energy lot manager, in the 1984 cult classic Repo Man.

Personal life and death
McGee was in a live-in relationship with actor Max Julien from 1974 to 1977. They starred together in the 1974 film Thomasine & Bushrod.

In 1987, McGee married actor Carl Lumbly, with whom she had one child, Brandon, born in 1988. McGee died of cardiac arrest on July 9, 2010, at the age of 65.

Selected filmography

References

External links
 
 Obituary – LA Times
 Obituary – New York Times
 

1945 births
2010 deaths
20th-century American actresses
21st-century American actresses
Actresses from San Francisco
African-American actresses
American film actresses
American television actresses
San Francisco State University alumni
Spaghetti Western actresses
20th-century African-American women
20th-century African-American people
21st-century African-American women
21st-century African-American people